The Motorola Charm is a smartphone manufactured by Motorola. It was released exclusively to U.S. carrier T-Mobile, and Canadian carrier Telus. The Motorola Charm is the second Motorola Android phone to feature the updated Motoblur UI for Android 2.1.

The Charm's key features are its front-facing QWERTY keyboard, 2.8-inch 320 x 240 touchscreen, 3-megapixel camera with digital zoom, touchpad on rear of phone, and Android HTML WebKit/Flash Lite web browser.

See also 
 List of Android devices
 Motoblur

References

External links 
 

Android (operating system) devices
Charm
Mobile phones with an integrated hardware keyboard
Discontinued smartphones